Pascal Juan Estrada (born 12 March 2002) is an Austrian professional footballer who plays as a defender for Slovenian PrvaLiga side Olimpija Ljubljana.

Club career
In 2018, Estrada joined the youth academy of English Premier League side Wolverhampton Wanderers. In 2022, he signed for Olimpija Ljubljana in Slovenia. On 17 July 2022, he debuted for Olimpija during a 2–0 win over Mura in the first round of the 2022–23 Slovenian PrvaLiga.

International career
Estrada was capped for Austria at under-18 level, making two appearances against Cyprus in February 2020.

Personal life
Estrada's father, Mario Mühlbauer, was also a professional footballer.

References

External links
 
 Pascal Estrada at ÖFB 

2002 births
Living people
Footballers from Linz
Austrian footballers
Austria youth international footballers
Austrian people of Spanish descent
Association football defenders
Wolverhampton Wanderers F.C. players
NK Olimpija Ljubljana (2005) players
Slovenian PrvaLiga players
Austrian expatriate footballers
Austrian expatriate sportspeople in England
Austrian expatriate sportspeople in Slovenia
Expatriate footballers in England
Expatriate footballers in Slovenia